Hand game may refer to:

 Hand game, games played using only the hands
 Hand game (cards), a type of contract in certain card games
 Handgame, an Indian gambling game.